Abdul Fattah bin Mohd Amin (born 14 September 1990) is a Malaysian actor and singer. He is known for playing as Adrian, the main character in the drama Playboy Itu Suami Aku. After his debut performance was criticized for lack of inventory as an actor, Fattah waited for two years to prove himself. In 2015, Fattah was generally accepted as an actor because of acting stints in several dramas such as Bencinta, Plan Cinta Tak Jadi and the opportunity to develop his career to Indonesia through the telemovie  I Pursue Love To Malaysia  and  From Hater To Lover. He continued his career as Captain Ejaz Fakhri alongside Neelofa in the play Suri Hati Mr. Pilot and Tengku Ian Uzzam alongside Fazura in the play Hero Seorang Cinderella. He is also married to actress Fazura.

Early life
Fattah Amin was born and raised in Kuantan. In addition to his career, he is also actively involved in business named Stalkers Cafe and Expendables Gym, located at Kota Damansara.

Personal life
On 23 November 2017, Fattah confirmed that he and Fazura got engaged on 13 November 2017. The pair made the official announcement at a packed press conference. They both met while shooting for the drama Hero Seorang Cinderella which aired on Slot MegaDrama Astro Ria. They got married in a private ceremony where only family members and close friends were invited on 27 November 2017, at Ritz Carlton in Kuala Lumpur.

Filmography

Film

Television series

Telemovie

Television

Discography

Product Ambassador

Awards and nominations

References

External links
 

Malaysian male actors
Malaysian male models
Living people
1990 births